Klamath County may refer to:

Klamath County, California, a former county of the U.S. state of California
Klamath County, Oregon, a current county of the U.S. state of Oregon